Roy Bin Wong (born 1949) is a Chinese economic historian at UCLA.

He was the Director of the UCLA Asia Institute from 2004 to 2016.

He received his BA from the University of Michigan, and received his MA and PhD from Harvard University.

Works
 China Transformed: Historical Change and the Limits of European Experience  (Cornell University Press, 1997)

References

External links
 Roy Bin Wong's Page at UCLA
 R. Bin Wong Examines Asia's Place in World History, Columbia University

1949 births
Living people
University of Michigan alumni
Harvard University alumni
University of California, Los Angeles faculty
Economic historians
21st-century American historians
21st-century American male writers
21st-century American economists
Historians from California
American male non-fiction writers